Puerto Rico Highway 744 (PR-744) is a north–south road located entirely in the municipality of Guayama, Puerto Rico.

Major intersections

See also

 List of highways numbered 744

References

External links
 

744
Guayama, Puerto Rico